Halothamnus bottae is a species of the plant genus Halothamnus, that belongs to the subfamily Salsoloideae of the family Amaranthaceae. It occurs on the Arabian peninsula.

Morphology 
Halothamnus bottae is a shrub 30–50 cm high, with blueish-green, thorny branches. The leaves are standing off from the branches, they are triangular, and only 0,7-3 (rarely 8) mm long. The flowers are 2,6-3,6 mm long. The winged fruit is 6–9 mm in diameter. The bottom of the fruit tube has large ovate shallow pits alternating with five prominent radial veins (from the navel to the tepals).

The subspecies H. bottae subsp. niger differs by green twigs soon becoming black, and by dark brown wings of fruit.

Taxonomy 

Halothamnus bottae has been first described in 1845 by Hippolyte François Jaubert and Édouard Spach (in Illustrationes plantarum orientalium, volume 2, pl. 136). It is the type species of the genus Halothamnus.

It consists of two subspecies:
Halothamnus bottae subsp. bottae
Halothamnus bottae subsp. niger Kothe-Heinr.

Distribution 
Halothamnus bottae is endemic on the Arabian peninsula (Saudi Arabia, Yemen, Oman, United Arab Emirates). 
It grows in open shrubland and semidesert on dry stony ground, from 0–2000 m above sea level. The subspecies H. bottae subsp. niger occurs only on southern Arabian peninsula, in hot arid lowlands up to 100 m above sea level (similar plants from eastern Africa belong to Halothamnus somalensis).

Uses 
In Oman, the dried parts of Halothamnus bottae are used as snuff.

Vernacular names 
In Saudi-Arabia, it is known as "hamḑ al-arnab" and "tiḩyan". In Oman, Jibbali and Dhofari, commons names are "hamdeh" and "kizzot". In Yemen, it is called "asal" and "tanēt".

References

External links 

 
 Halothamnus bottae at Tropicos 
 Photos of Halothamnus bottae at arkive.org

bottae